A first hop redundancy protocol (FHRP) is a computer networking protocol which is designed to protect the default gateway used on a subnetwork by allowing two or more routers to provide backup for that address; in the event of failure of an active router, the backup router will take over the address, usually within a few seconds.  In practice, such protocols can also be used to protect other services operating on a single IP address, not just routers.

Examples of such protocols include (in approximate order of creation):

 Hot Standby Router Protocol (HSRP) - Cisco's initial, proprietary standard developed in 1998
 Virtual Router Redundancy Protocol (VRRP) - an open (albeit patent encumbered) standard protocol
 Common Address Redundancy Protocol (CARP) - patent-free unencumbered alternative to Cisco's HSRP developed in October 2003
 Extreme Standby Router Protocol (ESRP) - Extreme Networks' proprietary standard with fast failover and also layer 2 protection
 Gateway Load Balancing Protocol (GLBP) - a more recent proprietary standard from Cisco that permits load balancing as well as redundancy
 Routed Split multi-link trunking (R-SMLT) - an Avaya redundancy protocol
 NetScreen Redundancy Protocol (NSRP) - a Juniper Networks proprietary router redundancy protocol providing load balancing
 Chassis Cluster Redundant Ethernet - a Juniper Networks proprietary Ethernet redundancy protocol, used on its SRX platform
 Multi-active Gateway Protocol (MAGP) - a Mellanox proprietary protocol based on VRRP that allows active-active operation

References 

 
Internet protocols